The New England Pro Wrestling Hall of Fame and Fan Fest  is an American professional wrestling hall of fame. It was established in January 2008 to honor select wrestling personalities who have made significant contributions to professional wrestling in New England and the Northeastern United States.

History
The idea for the hall of fame was conceived by Joseph Bruen, a longtime ring announcer and promoter in Massachusetts, who felt that wrestling personalities from the New England region, both regional and national, should be recognized for their achievements in pro wrestling. Inductees receive a commemorative plaque that have their names inscribed on it with the date of their induction into the hall of fame. The original Class of 2008 were inducted by Bruen's APCW Ringwars promotion; the induction ceremonies were featured at three supercards over the course of the year – Battleclash (March 29), Battlebowl (August 23), and Thanksgiving Meltdown (November 9) – all held at the American Legion in Seekonk, Massachusetts.

APCW Battleclash (March 29, 2008) – Reverend Chain Branagan, Robbie Ellis, Sandy Starr, Cody Boyns, "Iceburg" Sonny Dee, Travis Funk, Anthony Rufo, Gary Gold, and Bert Centeno.
ACPW Battlebowl (August 23, 2008) – Shane Simons, Tommy Degnan, "Sweet" Scott Ashworth, Brickhouse Baker, Lobsterman Jeff Costa, Rich Palladino, Jose Perez, and Terry Allen.
APCW Thanksgiving Meltdown (November 9, 2008) – Bill Hardy, Danny Cama, Derek Molhan, Gary Apollo, Mark Amaral, Rip Morrison, "Chief" Dave Fox, Tony Rumble, and Walter "Killer" Kowalski.

Starting in 2009, the induction ceremonies have taken place at an annual banquet dinner at the Brotherhood of the Holy Ghost Charity Hall (Brightridge Club) in East Providence, Rhode Island. 2010 saw the first of the "fan fests", a two-day event in which inductees and special guests could interact with the fans, as well as the banquet dinner; one of the evening's highlights was the induction of the Savoldi wrestling family which included a speech from Angelo Savoldi who, at 95 years old, was the world's oldest living wrestler at the time. In addition to the hall of fame inductees, the event has also featured many wrestling stars at its "fan fest" weekend participating as guest speakers as well as autograph signings and Q&A sessions. The 2011 edition, for example, was hosted by longtime World Wrestling Federation ring announcer Howard Finkel and was attended by former inductees Ox Baker (2009) and "Dangerous" Danny Davis (2010) as well as Short Sleeve Sampson, The Iron Sheik, Brutus "The Barber" Beefcake, Doink the Clown, Paul Bearer, Tammy Lynn Sytch, Rosita, Balls Mahoney, Axl Rotten, Shane Douglas, Duane Gill, Armando Estrada, Kenny Dykstra, Jay Lethal, Antonio Thomas, and manager Johnny Fabulous. The Class of 2011 included Georgiann Makropoulos, Samula Anoa'i, Tito Santana, Rick Martel, and Chief Jay Strongbow; former WWF World Heavyweight Champion Bob Backlund made a surprise appearance during the second half of the induction ceremony. Jamison, a 1980s wrestling personality best remembered as the hapless television sidekick of Bobby "The Brain" Heenan on WWF Primetime Wrestling, made his first-ever appearance at a wrestling event to receive the "Most Entertaining Personality Award".

The New England Pro Wrestling Hall of Fame has recognized wrestling personalities from a number of different organizations from the "territory-era" World Wide Wrestling Federation, International World Class Championship Wrestling, Killer Kowalski's International Wrestling Federation, and Big Time Wrestling to modern-day "indy" promotions such as the All-Star Wrestling, Century Wrestling Alliance, Chaotic Wrestling, the Millennium Wrestling Federation, New England Championship Wrestling, New England Wrestling Alliance, Power League Wrestling, PWF Northeast, South Coast Championship Wrestling, and Yankee Pro Wrestling. Organizations from the East Coast of the United States have also been acknowledged including the East Coast Wrestling Association, Extreme Championship Wrestling, the House of Pain Wrestling Federation, New England Championship Wrestling, as well as the National Wrestling Alliance and World Wrestling Entertainment. , it was Rhode Island's first and only wrestling convention, and the largest event in the New England region. A third New England Pro Wrestling Hall of Fame and Fan Fest was announced for June 9, 2012, however, it has since been postponed until the summer of 2013.

Special awards

Inductees

Footnotes
 – Entries without a birth name indicates that the inductee did not perform under a ring name.
 – This section mainly lists the major accomplishments of each inductee in New England.
 – Wrestler was originally inducted as part of the inaugural Class of 2008 ceremonies but was unable to attend; their "official" ceremony took place at the 2009 edition of the New England Pro Wrestling Hall of Fame.

See also
List of professional wrestling conventions
List of professional wrestling halls of fame

References

External links

Promotional video for the 2010 New England Pro Wrestling Hall of Fame and Fan Fest Weekend
New England Pro Wrestling Hall of Fame at CoonsPhotography.com

2008 establishments in the United States
Awards established in 2008
Professional wrestling halls of fame
Halls of fame in Rhode Island
Organizations based in Providence, Rhode Island
Professional wrestling-related lists